eMotorWerks, an Enel Group Company, is an electric vehicle infrastructure company, based in San Carlos, California.  eMotorWerks was founded in 2010 by Val Miftakhov, who was also its CEO until it merged with Enel X. eMotorWerks was acquired by Enel through its EnerNOC, and is part of the Enel X group.

History

eMotorWerks Modular Mechanical Conversion System
The company started as a developer of Electric Vehicle conversion kits in 2010, and by 2012 had a product. The Modular Mechanical Conversion System was designed "to hold all the EV components and attach them to the donor vehicle. The system is adaptable with minor modifications to many types of passenger vehicles."

JuiceBox EVSE
eMotorWerks started development of its JuiceBox as a DIY kit, funding it via Kickstarter in 2013.

JuiceNet

JuiceNet enabled Charging stations pay the user back in average EV driver $133/year for consuming cleaner (and cheaper) electricity. "the average EV owner returning about that amount over 3 years.

Awards
 2018 Global Cleantech 100
 2018 Silver Edison Awards on Energy & Sustainability, Vehicle Advancements
 2017 Inc. (magazine) America's 500 highest growth companies
 2017 Grid Edge Awards
 2016 Energy Productivity Innovation Challenge (EPIC) Award at the World Business Council for Sustainable Development (WBCSD) side event at the UN Climate Summit

See also
Charging station
Plug-in vehicle
Plug-in hybrid vehicle

References

External links
 

Electric vehicle infrastructure developers
American companies established in 2010